The Combined Arms Research Library (CARL) at Fort Leavenworth, Kansas is a United States Army library that supports the United States Army Command and General Staff College.  Its collection of over 300,000 books covers all aspects of military science: joint and combined operations; tactics and doctrinal development; leadership, intelligence, weapons, equipment, and training. The Archives and Special Collections house a unique collection of over 200,000 items and the documents collection consists of another 250,000. Each year, the CARL reference staff answers some 30,000 queries for soldiers, faculty and staff at Fort Leavenworth, Kansas and throughout the world via the Defense Digital Library Reference Service. Scholars, writers and the DoD community use the Combined Arms Research Library's archival materials, extensive research materials, and historical documents. The Combined Arms Research Library is one of the largest and most well respected libraries in the Army  and was named the 2007 Federal Library of the Year by the Federal Library and Information Center Committee (FLICC).

Mission statement
 CARL advances the educational mission of the CGSC by providing scholarly resources and expertise in academic research support.
 Provide assistance to Fort Leavenworth and other DOD offices and installations in their search for useful information resources.
 CARL provides educational and recreational resources and offers programs that enhance the lives of the Fort Leavenworth community.

Photo gallery

References

External links
 Combined Arms Research Library Homepage
 Combined Arms Research Library Digital Library
 United States Army Command and General Staff College

Academic libraries
Command and General Staff College
Buildings and structures in Leavenworth County, Kansas
Military in Kansas
Fort Leavenworth